Pōmare or Pomare may refer to:

Tahiti
Pōmare dynasty, the dynasty of the Tahitian monarchs
Pōmare I (c. 1742–1803), first king of the Kingdom of Tahiti
Pōmare II (c. 1774–1821), second king of Tahiti
Pōmare III (1820–1827), third king of Tahiti
Pōmare IV (1813–1877), queen of Tahiti (fourth monarch)
Pōmare V (1839–1891), fifth and last king of Tahiti

Other people
Pōmare I (Ngāpuhi) (died 1826), Ngāpuhi leader, also called Whētoi
Pōmare II (Ngāpuhi) (died 1850), Ngāpuhi leader, nephew of Pōmare I, originally called Whiria, also called Whētoi
Hare Pomare (died 1864), performer, son of Pōmare II
Wiremu Piti Pomare (died 1851), originally called Pomare and Pomare Ngatata, Ngāti Mutunga leader
Māui Pōmare (c. 1875–1930), New Zealand Māori doctor and politician

Places
 Pomare, Lower Hutt, New Zealand
 Pomare railway station, situated in the above suburb
 Pomare, Bay of Plenty, a suburb of Rotorua in New Zealand